Pelaverga is a red wine grape variety native to Piedmont. It is described as rare and pale, and lends itself to making lightly sparkling, strawberry-flavoured wines.

It may also be used as a table grape.

Synonyms
Pelaverga is also known under a range of synonyms, among them: Caleura, Calora, Cari, Cario, Carola, Carolon, Peilaverga, Pela Verga, Uva Coussa, and Uva delle Zuche.

References

Red wine grape varieties
Wine grapes of Italy
Wine grapes of Piedmont